Russian Aircraft Corporation "MiG", commonly known as Mikoyan and MiG, was a Russian aerospace and defence company headquartered in Begovoy District, Moscow.

Mikoyan was successor to the Soviet Mikoyan and Gurevich Design Bureau (Микоя́н и Гуре́вич, МиГ; OKB-155 design office prefix MiG) founded in 1939 by aircraft designers Artem Mikoyan and Mikhail Gurevich. Mikoyan were notable for their fighter and interceptor aircraft which became a staple of the Soviet Air Force and Russian Air Forces, nations within the Soviet sphere of influence, and other nations such as India and many Arab states. Mikoyan aircraft were frequently used in aerial confrontations with American and allied forces during and since the Cold War, and have become commonly featured aircraft in popular culture. Mikoyan aircraft were the most produced jet fighter family.

In 2006, Mikoyan became a division of the United Aircraft Corporation in a merger with Ilyushin, Irkut, Sukhoi, Tupolev, and Yakovlev by decree of the Russian President Vladimir Putin.

History

Mikoyan was established on 8 December 1939 as the Pilot Design Department of the Aviation Plant #1 and headed by Artem Mikoyan and Mikhail Gurevich. It was later renamed "Experimental Design Bureau named after A.I. Mikoyan" otherwise known as the Mikoyan Design Bureau or Mikoyan OKB. In 1964 Gurevich retired, and Mikoyan died in 1970. He was succeeded by Rostislav A. Belyakov, and in 1978 the enterprise was named after Mikoyan.

In 1995, Mikoyan OKB was merged with two production facilities to form the Moscow Aviation Production Association "MiG" (MAPO-MiG). In the 1990s MiG began developing Mikoyan Project 1.44, a fifth-generation jet fighter, but the project was hampered by a lack of funding and was eventually canceled.

In December 1999, Nikolai Nikitin was appointed the corporation's General Director and General Designer. Nikitin focused most of the company's resources on the development of the Tu-334 passenger aircraft at the expense of military programs. This prompted the resignation in December 1999 of many of its leading military aircraft designers, including the chief designers and their deputies for the MiG-29 and MiG-31 programs.

Nikitin was replaced by Valery Toryanin in November 2003, who was in turn replaced by Alexey Fedorov in September 2004. In 2006, the Russian government merged 100% of Mikoyan shares with Ilyushin, Irkut, Sukhoi, Tupolev, and Yakovlev as a new company named United Aircraft Corporation. Specifically, Mikoyan and Sukhoi were placed within the same operating unit.

MiG failed to win any major aircraft tender in the post-Soviet era, falling behind its Russian rival Sukhoi. According to press reports, the company was shedding hundreds of employees in late 2017 due to a shortage of orders.

As of 2015 the company's business offering consists mostly of modernized MiG-29 aircraft. MiG was developing a 4++ fighter, the MiG-35, with the first deliveries expected in late 2019.

See also 
 List of Mikoyan and MiG aircraft
 List of military aircraft of the Soviet Union and the CIS

References

External links

 Migavia.ru – official site of MiG "OKB" successor enterprise
 Russian Aviation Museum, MiG Pages

Aircraft manufacturers of Russia
Aircraft manufacturers of the Soviet Union
Unmanned aerial vehicle manufacturers
Defence companies of the Soviet Union
United Aircraft Corporation
 
Golden Idea national award winners
Russian brands
Design bureaus